Mother is the third studio album by Australian duo Xylouris White. It was released on 19 January 2018, through Bella Union. At the ARIA Music Awards of 2018 it was nominated for Best World Music Album.

Critical reception

Mother was met with "generally favorable" reviews from critics. At Metacritic, which assigns a weighted average rating out of 100 to reviews from mainstream publications, this release received an average score of 78, based on 11 reviews. Aggregator Album of the Year gave the release a 75 out of 100 based on a critical consensus of 10 reviews.

Thom Jurek from AllMusic said the album is "more spacious album than either of its predecessors. Each tune births further exploration as each statement is a (sometimes slightly) varied response but more often a question. While the album is integral to its predecessors as part of a loosely conceived and articulated musical trilogy, it stands on its own as an exercise in close listening, careful communication, and quiet revelation." Vish Khanna from Exclaim! said: "Mother finds Xylouris White quietly questioning musical structure and expectations. They remain trailblazing outliers with a supernatural power to express themselves as one and, with a warmth and welcoming generosity of spirit, invite listeners to step up and out of their comfort zones." Robin Denselow from The Guardian wrote: "Their two earlier albums were remarkable for their blend of improvisation and energy, and the new set proves they are capable of treating elegant, thoughtful songs with an equal spirit of adventure. The quieter songs bring further displays of the empathy between them, with the thoughtful Lullaby providing a delicate ending to an exhilarating set."

Track listing

Personnel

Musicians
 George Xylouris – vocals, cretan laouto, cello
 Jim White – drums
 Aristeidis Chairetis – backing vocals
 Anna Roberts-Gevalt – violin
 Giorgis Stavrakakis – backing vocals
 Mitsos Stavrakakis – backing vocals

Production
 Eli Crews – mixing
 Bryce Goggin – engineer, mixing
 Harris Newman – mastering
 Guy Picciotto – mixing, producer
 Yosimar Gomez – engineer
 Nikos Kefalogiannis – engineer, mixing

References

2018 albums
Bella Union albums
Xylouris White albums